Chakh (Chechen: Эла Чах), sometimes also referred to as Chakhig (Chechen: Эла Чахиг), was a Chechen ruler and the king of the Alans and Durdzuks from 1253 to 1278 as well as the leader of the Uprising of the North Caucasians, which is also commonly referred to as the Dedyakov rebellion. Chakh belonged to the powerful Sado-Orsoy dynasty of Chechnya and was the successor of Khour I. Chakh (Or Chakhig) means "redheaded" in the Chechen language.

Family and descendants 

 Khasi I
 Khour I
 Chakh
 Khasi II
 Khour II
 Makhama
 Surakat
 Bayr
 Sarka

Early life 
Chakh was born in 1240, shortly after his mother, Esirat, managed to escape Maghas through a secret passage into Cheberloy, as it was besieged by the Mongols.
Chakh, along with his father was also one of the survivors of the persecution of the royal house by the Mongols, and through him, the ruling family survived.
Chakh-Aul, a place in the Orsoy town, was the personal estate of Chakh.

Early reign 
Chakh was crowned in 1253, a year after the assassination of his father. Having become the new ruler of the Durdzuks and Alans, Chakh continues the work of his father, the fight against the Mongols. He would later become the main leader of the uprising of the North Caucasians, commonly known as the Dedyakov Rebellion.

Uprising of the North Caucasians

Prelude 
Tax oppression as well as the brutal policies of the Mongols towards the North Caucasians led to armed clashes between the two sides in 1277. Taking advantage of the instability, Chakh launched a mighty uprising against the Mongol Empire.

The uprising 
Mengu Khan gathered an army, however, fearing it is not large enough, he also asked help from Russian princes. Aim of the campaign was the capture and destruction of the city Dedyakov, the center of the uprising.

The "Glorious city Yassky Dedyakov" was besieged in the beginning of 1278, until it fell to the troops of Mengu-Timur in February of the same year, after which it was plundered and then burned down.
Chakh managed to escape, however, despite the devastating defeat, refused to surrender.

Death 
After the destruction of Dedyakov, Chakh, along with his companions, fled south, aiming to reach the mountains South of lake Kazenoy-Am, however, the troops of the Khan managed to overtake Chakhigs detachment. The rebellious king, along with his companions, refusing to surrender, stabbed and killed themselves on horseback, after which they threw themselves off a cliff near the Arzhiy-Ahk river.

Successor 
Although Chakh was succeeded by his son, Khasi II, his death severely weakened the influence of the Sado-Orsoy dynasty, as the Durdzuks and Alans stopped recognizing the king over themselves.

See also 
 Khasi II
 Khour I
 Khasi I
 Mongol invasions of Durdzuketi
 Siege of Maghas
 Botur

References

Literature 

 
 
 
 
 

History of Chechnya
History of Ingushetia
Chechen people
Chechen politicians
Lists of 13th-century people
Nakh peoples
13th-century rulers
1278 deaths
History of the North Caucasus